Punta Prieta may refer to:

Punta Prieta, Baja California, a desert town in the Mexican state of Baja California
Punta Prieta, Baja California Sur, a small town on the west coast of the Mexican state of Baja California Sur